Elrod is an unincorporated community in Clark County, in the U.S. state of South Dakota.

History
Elrod was originally called Ida. The community's present name is for Samuel H. Elrod, a personal friend of the original owner of the town site; Samuel Elrod later served as Governor of South Dakota from 1905 to 1907. A post office was established as Ida in 1883, renamed Elrod in 1884, and the post office was discontinued in 1954.

References

Unincorporated communities in Clark County, South Dakota
Unincorporated communities in South Dakota